Penmaenmawr is a town and community in Conwy County Borough, Wales, which was formerly in the parish of Dwygyfylchi and the traditional county of Caernarfonshire. It is on the North Wales coast between Conwy and Llanfairfechan and was an important quarrying town, though quarrying is no longer a major employer. The population of the community was 4,353 in 2011, including Dwygyfylchi and Capelulo. The town itself having a population of 2,868 (2011).

It was named after Penmaenmawr mountain, which stands above the sea immediately west of the town. Much of its formerly rounded top (with an old hill-fort) has been quarried away, leaving the present-day lower flat top.

The town was bypassed by the A55 Expressway in the 1980s, losing its old Edwardian period promenade in the process, which was largely replaced by a modern one. Penmaenmawr is noted for its spectacular mountain and coastal walks. Nearby are the popular attractions of Bwlch Sychnant (Sychnant Pass) and Mynydd y Dref, and the town also lies partly within Eryri, the Snowdonia National Park.

Etymology
The name Penmaenmawr is the Welsh for "Head of the Great Stone", or "Great Headland of Stone" contrasting with Penmaenbach; Pen meaning "head", maen meaning "stone" and mawr meaning "large".

Geography

The villages that make up Penmaenmawr are Penmaenan and Pant Yr Afon on the west and Dwygyfylchi and Capelulo on the east. The bay is sheltered by the south-east tip of Anglesey and Ynys Seiriol (Puffin Island) to the north-west and the limestone headland of Pen-y-Gogarth (the Great Orme) to the north-east. The sea is shallow here between Traeth Lafan and the Conwy estuary. The beach is extensive, consisting of smooth pebbles and a wide expanse of sand; it was awarded a Blue Flag for five years running.

Two headlands separate Penmaenmawr from its neighbours. In the west the bulk of Penmaen Mawr lies between the town neighbouring Llanfairfechan and the wider coastal plain extending to Bangor. To the east the smaller but no less rugged headland of Penmaen Bach divides Dwygyfylchi from Conwy Morfa. 
Penmaenbach is the most northerly tip of the Snowdonia National Park, which covers a large part of Dwygyfylchi and Capelulo. To the south an arc of hills and uplands extends east to west from Capelulo to Penmaen Mawr, beginning with Yr Allt Wen above Dwygyfylchi, Bwlch Sychnant (the old road crosses this pass to Conwy) and Pen-sychnant at Capelulo. The rounded hill of Foel Lys, Gwddw Glas (Green Gorge), Bryn Derwydd and the head of Cwm Graiglwyd and finally Penmaen-mawr.

The coastal plain is nearly divided by Trwyn-yr-Wylfa, which also marks the boundary between Pant-yr-afon and Penmaenan in the west and the Hen Bentra or "Old Village" of Dwygyfylchi and Capelulo in the east. Two small rivers flow through the area.

History

Prehistory
The uplands above the town have many prehistoric remains, including the site of prehistoric polished stone axe factories on the west slopes of Cwm Graiglwyd near the top of Penmaen-mawr. This was once one of the most important stone axe manufacturing sites in Europe, together with the Langdale axe industry in the Lake District, Tievebulliagh in County Antrim and other sites across Britain.

There is evidence that axes from Graiglwyd were exported widely 5,000 years ago, examples having been found as far afield as Cornwall and south-east England. The nearby Meini Hirion, known in English as Druid's Circle, is a prehistoric stone circle. Archaeological excavations have discovered the cremated remains of children at the site. A prehistoric trackway from Bwlch-y-ddeufaen to Conwy runs by the circle. The summit area was crowned by Braich-y-Dinas, one of the largest Iron Age hill-forts in Europe, comparable with Tre'r Ceiri near Trefor on the Llŷn peninsula. However, nothing remains today; the last remnants were obliterated by quarrying in the 1920s.

Medieval and early modern periods 

According to tradition, the 5th- or 6th-century saint Seiriol, after whom Ynys Seiriol (also known as Puffin Island or Priestholme) is named, had a hermit's cell in Cwm Graiglwyd. A declivity, Clipyn Seiriol, above the modern road tunnel through Penmaen-mawr, also bears his name, as does the modern church of St Seiriol's near the town centre. The older church of St Gwynin's in Dwygyfylchi is the parish church today. Penmaenmawr is also associated with Saint Ulo, Capelulo being at the foot of Sychnant and reputedly the site of an early medieval chapel.

From the early Middle Ages onwards the parish has been part of Arllechwedd Uchaf, and this ancient Welsh cwmwd (English: commote), which together with neighbouring Arllechwedd Isaf makes up the cantref (hundred) of Arllechwedd, is still used by the church as an administrative unit today.

Quarrying town and seaside resort
 

The industrial quarrying of igneous rock (diorite) at Penmaenan began in 1830 with the opening of the Penmaen Quarry and the subsequent, competing Graiglwyd and 'Old' quarries which were amalgamated by 1888 under Colonel Darbishire. Most of the production in these early years was of setts and paving, but from 1881 the advantage of crushed rock for railway ballast was demonstrated and new crushing mills were built to provide for that market. In 1911 Darbishire merged these operations with the quarries of Trefor to form the Penmaenmawr & Welsh Granite Co. As the industry grew, workers and their families flocked to Penmaenmawr from all over north-west Wales and beyond. The link was especially strong with Trefor, the home of Trefor granite quarry on the slopes of Yr Eifl. The community which sprang up in the present-day wards of Penmaenan and Pant-yr-afon was close-knit and almost entirely Welsh-speaking. By the early years of the 20th century about 1,000 men worked in the quarry and its associated workshops. Neighbouring Llanfairfechan was an integral part of this process.

The quarried stone was lowered by self-acting inclines to the  gauge tramway which ran to jetties from where the setts were loaded into ships. After 1848 the majority of the quarry output was sent by main-line rail, although the quarry and its internal narrow gauge railway continued to operate through the 19th century.

Life was not easy for the quarrymen, especially those who worked on the higher slopes. They were expected to walk up to the summit area in all weathers and faced losing pay if unable to reach the top. A strong spirit of camaraderie developed and was reflected in the town's chapels, pubs and cultural societies. Products were exported by rail to ports such as Liverpool and the cities of England and by sea from the two quarrying jetties to Liverpool and also to a number of European ports such as Hamburg. Ships continued to load cargoes from the Darbishire jetty until 1976, although sea trade had been sparse since the famous stranding of the Rethi Muller in 1967. Railway ballast continued to move in quantity from the sidings near the station, but all the original infrastructure was swept away by the building of the new A55 Expressway in the late 1980s. A new rail-loading facility was constructed and the original sidings space used for the new road. In 2008 the contract for the supply of railway ballast to Network Rail was lost, and since that time there have only been limited movements by rail – such as for construction of the Manchester Metrolink extensions. This quarrying over time removed the whole top of Penmaenmawr mountain, which was once much higher with a rounded top, with an old hill-fort.

The town grew in popularity as a seaside resort for the well-to-do in the second half of the 19th century, in part due to the enthusiasm shown by statesman and Prime Minister William Ewart Gladstone who holidayed eleven times in Penmaenmawr between 1855 and 1896.

Notable events
On 27 August 1950 the 1:45 am up-express passenger train from Holyhead to Euston, the Irish Mail, was approaching Penmaenmawr station at 60–70 mph after passing a distant signal set to 'clear'. As the train approached the home signal it was suddenly set to 'danger'. The driver shut off steam and applied the brake  but was not able to prevent a collision at 45–50 mph with a light engine on the up line. Four passengers and a sleeping car attendant were killed outright and a fifth passenger died in hospital.

On 24 September 1976, Penmaenmawr was the scene of a mass murder, as former submarine commander Neil Rutherford killed  four people at the Red Gables hotel, then set the hotel on fire and shot himself.

Amenities, clubs and societies
Amgueddfa (Penmaenmawr Museum) – an independent museum based at the Old Post Office, Pant yr Afon. 
Clwb Golff (Penmaenmawr Golf Club) – a 9-hole course on Hen Ffordd Conwy in Dwygyfylchi, one of the most scenic in north Wales.
Eden Hall – small historic gardens near the town centre
Clwb Snwcer (Penmaenmawr Snooker Club) – within the Community Centre on Ffordd Conwy 
Penmaenmawr Sailing Club – on Penmaenmawr Promenade
Penmaenmawr Bowling Club – opposite the promenade entrance near the railway station
Penmaenmawr Phoenix F.C. – the town's football team, composed mainly of local players.

Transport

Bus
Arriva Buses Wales routes 5 and X5 run every 15 minutes between Caernarfon and Llandudno, route X5 serving Deganwy and Maesdu and route 5 serving St Gwynan's (For Dwygyfylchi) and Craig-y-don eastbound and both services serve Bangor and Y Felinheli westbound.  A Saturday service X2 has been introduced by Padarn Bus that runs direct between Penmaenmawr and Llandudno eastbound, and to Llanberis via Bangor westbound.  Llew Jones runs the Conwy Clipa service 75 between Llanfairfechan and Llandudno.

Road
Penmaenmawr lies on the route of the A55 Expressway providing access at Junction 16 and at 16A to Dwygyfylchi to and from the rest of the north coast. A mountain route through Capelulo links the towns to Conwy via Sychnant.

Train
Hourly service from Penmaenmawr railway station by Transport for Wales to Holyhead and Chester on the North Wales Coast Line. These trains continue every two hours to Crewe and to Wrexham, Shrewsbury, Hereford, Abergavenny, Newport and Cardiff.

See also

References

External links

 A Vision of Britain Through Time
 British Listed Buildings
 Genuki
 Geograph
 Office for National Statistics
 Penmaenmawr and Dwygyfylchi Community Website
  The Sychnant Pass

 
Towns in Conwy County Borough